Stephen Ratcliffe (born July 7, 1948 in Boston, Massachusetts) is a contemporary U.S. poet and critic who has published a number of books of poetry and three books of criticism. He lives in Bolinas, CA and is the publisher of Avenue B Press. He was the director of the Creative Writing program at Mills College in Oakland, CA where he has been an instructor for more than 25 years, and continues to teach Creative Writing (poetry) and Literature (poetry, Shakespeare) courses there.

As of 2010, Ratcliffe has published at least 19 books of poetry (21 including the e-editions on Ubuweb) and as the editor and publisher of Avenue B Press.

Life and work
Ratcliffe moved to the San Francisco Bay area when he was 4 and has lived in Bolinas, CA since 1973. Ratcliffe attended Reed College for one and a half years before transferring to the University of California at Berkeley to finish his bachelor's degree and complete his PhD. He was also a Stegner Fellow at Stanford in 1974-75.

The focus of Ratcliffe's early academic career was on Renaissance poetry. Ratcliffe has pointed to his work on Thomas Campion during this time period as a defining event in his artistic development and poetic practice up to this point.

By the early 1980s, Ratcliffe had begun to read and ‘learn’ about, and from, the Language poets after his friend Bill Berkson, a fellow poet from Bolinas, gave Ratcliffe his set of original L=A=N=G=U=A=G=E magazines.

Ratcliff draws much of his inspiration from where he lives in Bolinas, California.

Poetics and recent work
Ratcliffe recognizes that his own particular commitment to writing has, over the years, displayed itself as something which works "serially":

Ratcliffe's writing from the past decade, beginning with 2000's Listening to Reading and stretching towards his most recent, ongoing Temporality project, becomes the insistent 'capture' of what, following on Merleau-Ponty, it could mean for us to be "meeting time on the way to subjectivity".

From this perspective, Ratcliffe's work not only addresses (tacitly) the concept of the "postmodern" 'crisis of the subject', but continues to invest itself, with increasing compactness and stability, in themes and obsessions he has delineated throughout his career, vocation, and a life devoted to "making" or poiesis.

Such an intense avowal implicates Ratcliffe's project within a timeline moving forward from the Renaissance poets to Stéphane Mallarmé and Henry James, or moving backward in time from  Leslie Scalapino to the Language poets and Gertrude Stein. Along the way, in either direction, Ratcliffe may take instruction from practices as widely divergent as the radicalized "quietude" of Yvor Winters, or the aleatoric music and chance procedures of John Cage. (see also: Aleatoricism)

Ratcliffe never strayed far from the themes of "music" and "being in number" discovered in his initial "Campion project".  He has not abandoned the touchstone that is Mallarmé, whose work he appropriated mid-career, culminating with 1998's Mallarmé: Poem in Prose. Ratcliffe's discussions of his writing processes, both in his interviews and essays, continue to acknowledge, along with Mallarmé, that:

Selected bibliography
Criticism
 Campion: On Song (Routledge & Kegan Paul, 1981)
 Listening to Reading (Albany, NY: SUNY Press, 2000)
 Reading the Unseen: (Offstage) Hamlet (Denver, CO: Counterpath Press, 2010)
Poetry
 New York Notes (Tombouctou Books, 1983)
 Distance (Bolinas, CA: Avenue B, 1986)
 Mobile/Mobile (Los Angeles, CA: Echo Park Press, 1987)
 [where late the sweet] BIRDS SANG (Oakland, CA: O Books, 1989)
 Sonnets (Elmwood, CT: Potes & Poets Press, 1989)
 Talking in Tranquility: Interviews with Ted Berrigan (edited by Ratcliffe & Leslie Scalapino). (Bolinas/Oakland, CA: Avenue B / O Books, 1991)
 spaces in the light said to be where one/ comes from (Elmwood, CT: Potes & Poets Press, 1992)
 Sculpture (Littoral Books, 1996)
 Mallarmé: Poem in Prose (Santa Barbara, CA: Santa Barbara Review Publications, 1998)
 Idea's Mirror (Elmwood, CT: Potes & Poets, 1999)
 Conversation (Plein Air Editions) – forthcoming

Triptych/Trilogy
note: the following works are on-going projects designated by Ratcliffe as trilogy / triptych(s). The dates in [brackets] indicate the time period during which the work was written. For example, [2.9.98. - 5.28.99.] indicates February 9, 1998 - May 28, 1999.
Triptych/Trilogy ~ each book is 474 pages/days :
Portraits & Repetition (The Post-Apollo Press, 2002) [2.9.98 – 5.28.99.]
REAL (Avenue B, 2007) [3.17.00 – 7.1.01]
 CLOUD / RIDGE (Ubu editions, 2007) [7.2.01. – 10.18.02]  – #25 in the “Publishing the Unpublishable” series available complete and on-line here
Triptych/Trilogy ~ each book is 1,000 pages/days:
HUMAN / NATURE (Ubu editions, 2007) [10.19.02. – 7.14.05.]  –  #26 in the “Publishing the Unpublishable” series available complete and on-line here
Remarks on Color / Sound (Eclipse, 2010) [7.15.05. – 4.9.08.]  – available complete and on-line here
Temporality [4.10.08. –  1.4.11] – an ongoing project appearing daily here as a blog text: Temporality, presumably up through its 1,000th day. "Temporality" is continuing on Ratcliffe's blog past that day [1.4.11] (January 4, 2011). Perhaps a new triptych has been started.

Notes and references

External links
 Publisher’s Ratcliffe Page from the publisher of Ratcliffe's most recent book of criticism: ‘’Reading the Unseen: (Offstage) Hamlet’’
Audio performances by Ratcliffe includes a reading of HUMAN/NATURE
Ratcliffe Author Page @ PENNSound
poems from Temporality
poems from CLOUD / RIDGE
CLOUD / RIDGE The complete text of Ratcliffe’s book, composed from July 2, 2001 through October 18, 2002. Part of Ubuweb’s series ‘’Publishing the Unpublishable’’ – 025: ubu editions www.ubu.com
HUMAN / NATURE The complete text of Ratcliffe’s book, composed from October 19, 2002 through July 14, 2005. Part of Ubuweb’s series ‘’Publishing the Unpublishable’’ – 026: ubu editions  www.ubu.com
Ratcliffe Author Page @durationpress.com this page has a link to a selection of poems from his 2002 collection ‘’Portraits & Repetitions’’
Ratcliffe Homepage @ EPC – Electronic Poetry Center

1948 births
English-language poets
American book publishers (people)
American male poets
Living people
Mills College faculty
Poets from California
Stegner Fellows
American editors